Nigel Ah Wong (born 30 May 1990) is a rugby union player, who currently plays as a centre for  in New Zealand's domestic National Provincial Championship competition.

Rugby career
Ah Wong played for Sunnybank in their inaugural Queensland Premier Rugby Hospital Cup victory in 2011. He played for the Melbourne Rebels on their 2011 European Tour after being selected for the 'Rebels Rising' development squad.

In 2012, Ah Wong was a member of the Australian Rugby Union’s National Academy, and was also chosen to represent the Queensland Reds in their exhibition match against the Hurricanes on the Sunshine Coast.

Ah Wong joined the Reds Extended Playing Squad for the 2013 Super Rugby season. He was initially named in the Reds College Squad, but was promoted when Joel Faulkner was forced to withdraw due to personal commitments.

After the 2013 Super Rugby season, Ah Wong was recruited by the Coca-Cola West Red Sparks to play in the Japanese Top League.

In 2017, Ah Wong signed for Counties Manukau in New Zealand's domestic competition, the Mitre 10 Cup.

In 2020, Ah Wong played for the Manawatu Turbos in the Mitre 10 Cup.

Super Rugby statistics

Reference list

External links
NZ Rugby History profile

1990 births
New Zealand rugby union players
New Zealand people of Chinese descent
New Zealand sportspeople of Samoan descent
Queensland Reds players
ACT Brumbies players
Canberra Vikings players
Rugby union flankers
New Zealand emigrants to Australia
Rugby union players from Wellington City
Living people
Coca-Cola Red Sparks players
Tokyo Sungoliath players
Expatriate rugby union players in Japan
Moana Pasifika players
Australian rugby union players
Rugby union centres
Rugby union wings
Counties Manukau rugby union players
Hanazono Kintetsu Liners players
New South Wales Country Eagles players
Manawatu rugby union players
Kobelco Kobe Steelers players
Blues (Super Rugby) players
Samoan rugby union players
Samoa international rugby union players
Bay of Plenty rugby union players